The following list includes notable people associated with the London Borough of Enfield.

Andy Abraham (b. 1964) – singer
Abz Love (b. Richard Breen, 1979) – musician
Adele (b. 1988) – singer/songwriter
Kacey Barnfield (b. 1988) – actress
Joseph Bazalgette (1819–1891) – civil engineer who rescued London's sewerage system
Sir Anthony Berry (1925–1984) – politician
Black the Ripper (1987–2020) - rapper, entrepreneur and cannabis activist 
James Blake (b. 1988) – musician 
Bernard Bresslaw (1934–1993) – actor
David Burrowes (b. 1969) – politician
Chas & Dave
Charles Childerstone (1872-1947), tenor and actor 
Roy Chipolina (b. 1983) – footballer
Dodie Clark (b. 1995) – musician
Charles Cowden Clarke (1787–1877) – author
Sharon D. Clarke (b. 1966) – actress and singer
Benjamin Clementine - singer/songwriter
Jim Crace (b. 1946) – writer
Paul Dacre - former Daily Mail editor
John Dalton (b. 1943) – musician, bassist with the Kinks
Alfie Deyes (b. 1993) – YouTuber and businessman
Benjamin Disraeli (1804–1881) – politician, prime minister and novelist
Isaac D'Israeli (1766–1848) – writer
Michael Duberry (b. 1975) – footballer
Rick Edwards (b. 1979) – radio and television presenter
Tim Eggar (b. 1951) – politician
Neale Fenn (b. 1977) – football player and manager
Caroline Flack (1979–2020) – television presenter
Bruce Forsyth (1928–2017) – TV personality
John French (1907–1966) – photographer
Mike Gatting (b. 1957) – cricketer
Anthony Giddens (b. 1938) - sociologist
Alison Goldfrapp (b. 1966)
Alan Hopes 
Chris Hughes (b. 1947) – quiz contestant
Nigar Jamal
David Jason
Jay1 - rapper
Hugh Jenkins, Baron Jenkins of Putney – politician
Russell Kane – comedian 
Boris Karloff – actor
John Keats – poet
Joe Keyes – rugby league player 
Kataxenna Kova (b. 1985) – model
Charles Lamb – poet and essayist
Norman Lewis
Terry Lightfoot
Nikki Lilly (b. 2003) – YouTuber
Jake Livermore
Andy Love 
Iain MacLeod – politician
Simon Mayo
Declan McKenna (b. 1998) – singer-songwriter, music producer, and activist
Paul McKenna
Julia McKenzie
Norris McWhirter
Ross McWhirter
Colin Metson
Ron Moody
Gregory Motton – playwright
Dave Murray – musician, guitarist for Iron Maiden
Harrison Palmer – cricketer
Walter Pater – writer
Trevor Peacock – actor
William Pitt, Earl of Chatham (1708–1778) – Prime Minister and statesman 
Lee Pluck (b. 1982) – football player with Barnet and Cambridge City
Michael Portillo – politician
Kathryn Prescott (b. 1991) – actress
Megan Prescott (b. 1991) – actress
Michelle Ryan (b. 1984) – EastEnders actress
Martin Saban (b. 1957) - QPR supporter
Scorcher (b. 1986) – rapper, actor, producer
 Sam Sloma (b. 1982) - football player
William Smith (1813–1893) – lexicographer
Louie Spence (b. 1969) - dancer
Rachel Stevens (b. 1978) – singer/songwriter, band member of S Club 7
Derek Taunt 
Norman Tebbit, Lord Tebbit
Alan Teulon, land surveyor
Professor Philip Tew 
Andrew Turnbull, Baron Turnbull 
Stephen Twigg
Chris Walker-Hebborn – swimmer, gold medallist in 100m backstroke at the 2014 European Championships and Commonwealth Games
Murray Walker
Jessie Wallace (b. 1971) – EastEnders actress
Tion Wayne - rapper
Neil 'Roberto' Williams – radio and television presenter
Paul Whitehouse
Amy Winehouse (1983–2011) – singer/songwriter
Ray Winstone
Professor Frederic Wood Jones

References

Enfield
Enfield, List of notable people associated with the London Borough of